Oxley Christian College is a private co-educational Christian school ranging from three-year-old kindergarten to Year 12.

Structure 
Oxley is a day school with a total enrolment of around 1000 students. The junior school includes the early childhood centre: Oxley Kids (three and four-year-old kinder), through to Year 6; the senior school encompasses Years 7 to 12.

Extracurricular activities

Sport 
Oxley is a member of the Eastern Independent Schools of Melbourne (EISM).

EISM premierships 
Oxley has won the following EISM senior premierships.

Combined:

 Badminton - 2021
Cross Country (2) - 2010, 2014

Boys:

 Basketball (6) - 2011, 2012, 2013, 2014, 2018, 2019
 Cricket (4) - 2008, 2009, 2010, 2011
 Cross Country - 2010
 Football 12's (2) - 2015, 2016
 Table Tennis - 2015

Girls:

 Basketball - 2014
 Cross Country (3) - 2010, 2014, 2015
 Hockey - 2012
 Netball (2) - 2008, 2011
 Soccer (4) - 2013, 2015, 2020, 2021
 Softball - 2011
 Tennis (2) - 2008, 2020
 Volleyball (2) - 2011, 2012

References

External links 
 Oxley Christian College website

Nondenominational Christian schools in Victoria (Australia)
Junior School Heads Association of Australia Member Schools
Private secondary schools in Melbourne
Educational institutions established in 1979
1979 establishments in Australia
Private primary schools in Melbourne
Buildings and structures in the Shire of Yarra Ranges